The 2022 SVB Eerste Divisie is the 88th season of the SVB Eerste Divisie, the top division football competition in Suriname. The season began on 25 February 2022.

Inter Moengotapoe, having won the title in 2018–19, were the title holders, since the 2019–20 edition was cancelled due to the COVID-19 pandemic in Suriname and the title was not awarded.

League table

Season Statistics

Top scorers

References

External links

SVB Eerste Divisie
Football in Suriname